Paul Bryant Samson (December 2, 1879 – November 11, 1967) was the fourth and sixth head football coach for Emporia State University in Emporia, Kansas and he held that position for four seasons, from 1904 until 1906 and then returning in 1908. His overall coaching record at ESU was 16–16.  This ranks him eighth at ESU in terms of total wins and ninth at ESU in terms of winning percentage.

References

1879 births
1967 deaths
Emporia State Hornets football coaches
People from Corydon, Iowa